The Tigrovaya (means: "Tiger's river", formerly Сица Sitsa) is a river in South part of Primorsky Krai, a right tributary of the Partizanskaya. The river rises in Livadiya Range (South Sikhote-Alin) and flows into the Partizanskaya.

A former name of the river is Sitsa or Xica, which means "western tributary" in Chinese. The name change occurred in 1972.

References

Rivers of Primorsky Krai